Paopi 28 - Coptic Calendar - Paopi 30

The twenty-ninth day of the Coptic month of Paopi, the second month of the Coptic year. On a common year, this day corresponds to October 26, of the Julian Calendar, and November 8, of the Gregorian Calendar. This day falls in the Coptic season of Peret, the season of emergence.

Commemorations

Feasts 

 Monthly commemoration of the Feasts of the Annunciation, Nativity, and Resurrection

Saints 

 The martyrdom of Saint Demetrius of Thessalonica
 The departure of Pope Gabriel VII, the ninety-fifth Patriarch of the See of Saint Mark

References 

Days of the Coptic calendar